Palestyna may refer to the following places:
Palestyna, Łódź Voivodeship (central Poland)
Palestyna, Podlaskie Voivodeship (north-east Poland)
Palestyna, Warmian-Masurian Voivodeship (north Poland)

See also
Palestina (disambiguation)